is a Japanese professional sumo wrestler from Nobeoka, Miyazaki. He is a member of the Sadogatake stable and made his professional debut in March 2007. He reached the top makuuchi division in July 2018.

Early life and sumo background
Born the grandson of former juryo rikishi  he was introduced to sumo at an early age. He was also attracted to judo at a young age as well participating in it from primary school on up. He led his elementary school to the best eight in judo, and his junior high school team to the Miyazaki prefecture championship. Originally he intended on going to high school as a judo player and wanted to become a cook joining the family restaurant with his father and grandfather after graduation. However he was inspired instead to join professional sumo after observing a practice session held by Sadogatake stable at their Kyushu lodgings.

Career
He would join Sadogatake stable in March 2007 at the age of 15. He weighed just 94 kg and was only 175 cm tall, and his stablemaster was concerned about whether he would be able to gain enough weight. He originally took the shikona  by simply adding the stable's traditional prefix "Koto" to his family name. He took a year from his debut to reach the fourth sandanme division but there he would hit his first road block. He would spend three years going up and down the sandanme division before finally reaching the third makushita division. He would then take the shikona Kotoekō borrowing the second kanji  from his grandfather's name. After another three years bouncing back and forth between the fourth and third divisions and on the back of five straight winning records he was promoted to the second juryo division. He was the first sekitori from Miyazaki Prefecture in 32 years, the last being  who spent just one tournament in juryo in January 1982.

He lasted only one tournament in the division, managing only a 5–10 record and being demoted back down to the third division. After a 4–3 winning record at makushita 1 he was immediately promoted back to the juryo division. However a 4–11 record saw him again demoted back to the third division. After a year in the makushita division he got a third chance as a sekitori in the juryo division and this time he did get his first winning record of 9–6 to remain in juryo. He became a juryo mainstay for a year and a half before an 11–4 record gained him promotion to the top makuuchi division. He was the first wrestler from Miyazaki Prefecture to reach the top division in 44 years (Kaneshiro being the last in September 1974). His promotion meant Kotoekō had achieved a goal he had set of exceeding his grandfather's highest rank.

In his first tournament in the top division he would perform rather poorly, managing only a 3–12 record and being demoted back to the juryo division. Two winning tournaments in September and November 2018 saw him promoted back to the top division. Even after two 7–8 losing records in January and March 2019 he remained at the same rank of maegashira 15 West, and in May he finally got his first winning record in the top division with an 8–7 winning record. He reached the rank of maegashira 7 in September 2019 but faced demotion to jūryō after only two wins against thirteen losses in the January 2020 tournament. With a good performance of 11-4 in the March tournament, he secured his return to makuuchi, where he posted a respectable 10 wins in July. He finished the 2020 season with records of 8-7 and 6-9 in September and November.

To begin 2021 he was ranked maegashira 11. That year he posted three losing records and three winning records. After going 9-6 in the May tournament, he was rewarded with the rank of maegashira 4, his highest yet. A 2-13 record in July meant he was demoted to back to maegashira 11. He went 3-12 in the last tournament of the year, leading to a rank of maegashira 17 to start 2022.

Kotoekō started 2022 with back-to-back kachi-koshi in the January and March tournaments. These performances saw him rise to the rank of maegashira 7 for the May tournament. However, a 6-9 record in May, followed a 5-6-4 (with absence due to a COVID-19 infection) record in July and 6-9 record in September saw him demoted to maegashira 12 ahead of the November tournament. He ended the last tournament of 2022 with a 7-8 record, losing to Nishikigi on the final day.

He began his 2023 campaign with a ranking of maegashira 13 in the January banzuke. In the first tournament of the year he finished with a 7-8 record, this time losing to Tobizaru on the final day.

Fighting style
Kotoekō favours a migiyotsu (right hand inside, left hand outside grip on his opponent's mawashi). His favourite winning kimarite is a straightforward oshidashi, or push out. He also regularly employs yorikiri, or force-out, and tsukiotoshi, or the thrust down.

Career record

See also
Glossary of sumo terms
List of active sumo wrestlers

References

External links
 
 Supporters Association website

1991 births
Living people
Japanese sumo wrestlers
Sumo people from Miyazaki Prefecture
Sadogatake stable sumo wrestlers